Rivers East senatorial district is one of the three senatorial districts in Rivers State, Nigeria. It is currently represented by George Thompson Sekibo (from the People's Democratic Party).

District profile
The Rivers East senatorial district has a projected population of 2,670,903. It covers the following local government areas:

Election results

2015

List of senators
John Azuta-Mbata (1999 – 2007)
George Sekibo (2007 – 2017)
Andrew Uchendu (2017 – 2018)

References

External links
LGA health authorities

Rivers State senatorial districts